Dulovce, until 1948 Nová Ďala is a village and municipality in the Komárno District in the Nitra Region of south-west Slovakia.

Geography 
The village is at an altitude of 135 metres and covers an area of 12.38 km².

History 
In historical records the village was first mentioned in 1356.
After the Austro-Hungarian army disintegrated in November 1918, Czechoslovak troops occupied the area, later acknowledged internationally by the Treaty of Trianon. Between 1938 and 1945 Dulovce once more  became part of Miklós Horthy's Hungary through the First Vienna Award. From 1945 until the Velvet Divorce, it was part of Czechoslovakia. Since then it has been part of Slovakia.

Demographics
According to the 2011 census, the municipality had 1,813 inhabitants. 1,494 of inhabitants were Slovaks, 195 Roma, 46 Hungarians, 11 Czechs and 67 others and unspecified.

Facilities 
The village has a public library, a gym and a football pitch.

See also
 List of municipalities and towns in Slovakia

References

Genealogical resources

The records for genealogical research are available at the state archive "Statny Archiv in Nitra, Slovakia"

 Roman Catholic church records (births/marriages/deaths): 1764-1895 (parish B)

External links 
 Dulovce at tourist-channel.sk
Surnames of living people in Dulovce

Villages and municipalities in the Komárno District